Anthene collinsi is a butterfly in the family Lycaenidae. It is found in western Ethiopia.

References

Butterflies described in 1980
Anthene
Endemic fauna of Ethiopia
Butterflies of Africa